The princeps senatus ( principes senatus) was the first member by precedence on the membership rolls of the Roman Senate. Although officially out of the cursus honorum and possessing no imperium, this office conferred prestige on the senator holding it.

History 

The princeps senatus was chosen by the pair of censors (that is, every 5 years on average) whenever there was a vacancy on the seat during their tenure. The princeps senatus was not a lifetime appointment. However, in practice, the incumbent princeps senatus was always re-appointed by the censors.

Traditionally, the princeps senatus had the honour of speaking first on any motion or topic presented by the presiding magistrate. By the middle republic, the princeps senatus was the most prestigious position in Rome and had adduced further privileges: he moved all routine senate business, having power to have his input directly moulded into them by choosing their wording. He also set out the possible options on controversial proposals. Some notable principes of this period were the famous Scipio Africanus (appointed in 199, 194, and 189) and Marcus Aemilius Lepidus, who was appointed a record six times between 179 and 154 and combined his position with that of pontifex maximus – the Roman chief priesthood.

Appointment 
The position of princeps senatus was not defined by law (lex), but by tradition (mos), which makes it more difficult to follow its evolution. For a long time, modern historians were influenced by the works of Theodor Mommsen, who thought that the principes senatus could only be patricians of the gentes maiores – the most illustrious patrician families (Cornelia, Valeria, Fabia, Aemilia, Manlia, and Claudia). However, Francis Ryan showed that Mommsen's argument was circular: he first asserted that the princeps must be from a gens maior, and later said the list of gentes maiores can be drawn from the principes – while ancient sources are silent on many principes and do not give the list of the gentes maiores. Ryan has argued instead that the princeps could be a plebeian: first, ancient sources never mention Mommsen's patrician requirement; second, because the post was established after the end of the Conflict of the Orders, the plebeians would not have allowed the patricians to create an office barred to them.

The princeps senatus appeared in the beginning of the third century BC, possibly in 275. Before this law, senators were about a hundred and appointed by the consuls among their supporters; membership of the Senate therefore changed every year. The lex Ovinia transferred the power to appoint senators to the censors, who could only remove senators in case of misconduct, thus making them appointed for life. The law also increased their number to 300. These changes led the censors to make an official list of senators, recording their right to seat in the Senate. The first censor to make this list was likely Appius Claudius Caecus, who was said to have invented the rhotacism in Latin, perhaps in the process of writing this list, since several Latin names changed in these years. Another reform of the Senate followed a few decades later: senators were by now picked among former magistrates. As a result, senators were ordered by the censors in several ranks according to their past magistracies. This ordering by seniority led to the creation of the princeps senatus: the first name on the list of senators, who was always the most senior ex-censor, patrician or plebeian; the censors could not make a choice between candidates. Caecus was almost certainly not the first princeps, because the extensive tradition about him would not have failed to mention this fact. He is also described as an old man speaking in the Senate against Pyrrhus . Since he was the most senior former sensor at that date, the first princeps was necessarily appointed after his death. The most probable candidate is therefore Quintus Fabius Maximus Rullianus, chosen by the censors of 275, whose lectio left a mark in ancient sources.

In 209 BC, the censor Publius Sempronius Tuditanus went against the tradition and appointed Quintus Fabius Maximus Verrucosus instead of Titus Manlius Torquatus, the senior ex-censor. Tuditanus justified his choice by saying that Fabius was the foremost of all the Romans ("princeps Romanae civitatis"). After this date, the princeps was the most important politician of the day, chosen among the ex-consuls, and often one of the sitting censors, appointed by the other censor. When the censors could not agree on a candidate, the choice was solved by lot, as in 209 BC.

Decline 
The status and function of princeps senatus ceased to be relevant after the reforms of Sulla in 82–80 BC. As dictator, Sulla established a strict oligarchic order in order to prevent any man from rising above the rest (for example, iteration of the consulship was banned). Several scholars, such as Theodor Mommsen and Ernst Badian, believe that Sulla even abolished the office. However, Sulla would probably not have demoted his close ally, the princeps Lucius Valerius Flaccus, who had enabled his appointment as dictator though the lex Valeria. Although the position probably continued – there was still a list of senators and someone had to be listed first – the prerogatives of the office fell away. In particular, consuls designate assumed the honour of speaking first. This may be because, through the 80s and 70s, the senior living ex-censors – the most senior members of the senate, in the absence of a formal princeps senatus due to the paucity of censorial lectiones, – were largely uninfluential and unimportant men. Even when named first in the list of senators, they were largely so named by default or custom and were unable to assert speaking privilege before more influential, but junior, consulars.

Pierre Willems and Francis Ryan have suggested that Cicero may have been the last princeps senatus of the Republic, appointed after April 43 by his fellow senators. Such restoration of this ancient office was part of "diehard republicans'" propaganda against Mark Antony, whom Cicero had violently attacked in his Philippicae. Cicero's ascribed leadership of the senate, however, may not necessarily correspond to the traditional princeps senatus''' office.

The position was revived by Augustus in 28 BC; he, irregularly, appointed himself. If the post was limited to certain gentes, the Julii were possibly ineligible, and Augustus was not yet then one of the customary candidates (senior ex-censors). Regardless, Augustus held the office until his death; it then absorbed into the emperor's offices and powers.

In the emperor's absence, it is possible that a senator was granted the privilege of holding this role when the Senate met; the notoriously unreliable Historia Augusta'' claimed that during the Crisis of the Third Century, some others held the position; in particular, it stated that the future emperor Valerian held the office in AD 238, during the reigns of Maximinus Thrax and Gordian I, and he continued to hold it through to the reign of Decius. The same source also makes the same claim about Tacitus when the Senate acclaimed him emperor in AD 275.

List of principes senatus

Citations

References

External links 
The Roman Law Library by Professor Yves Lassard and Alexandr Koptev.

Ancient Roman titles
 
Cursus honorum
Roman Senate